Gilbertiodendron pachyanthum is a species of plant in the family Fabaceae. It is found only in Cameroon. It is threatened by habitat loss.

References

pachyanthum
Endemic flora of Cameroon
Vulnerable plants
Taxonomy articles created by Polbot